Jens Madsen Hajslund (29 May 1877 – 28 August 1964) was a Danish sport shooter who competed in the 1912 Summer Olympics.

In 1912 he won the bronze medal as member of the Danish team in the team free rifle competition. In the team military rifle event he finished eighth. He also participated in the 300 metre free rifle, three positions but did not finish the contest.

References

External links
profile

1877 births
1964 deaths
Danish male sport shooters
ISSF rifle shooters
Olympic shooters of Denmark
Shooters at the 1912 Summer Olympics
Olympic bronze medalists for Denmark
Olympic medalists in shooting
Medalists at the 1912 Summer Olympics
Sportspeople from the Central Denmark Region